Arkana Publishing (or Penguin Arkana or just Arkana) is a publishing imprint of Penguin Group of mainly esoteric literature.

Authors
 Carlos Castaneda
 Alfred Douglas
 Michael Baigent
 Karlfried Graf Dürckheim
 P. D. Ouspensky
 Robin Skelton
 Robert John Stewart
 Richard Wilhelm
 Joseph Campbell
 G.I. Gurdjieff
 Arthur Koestler
 Idries Shah
 Maharishi Mahesh Yogi

Books

References

Book publishing companies of the United Kingdom
Esotericism
Occult books
Penguin Books